Samuel Laing (12 December 1812 – 6 August 1897) was a British railway administrator, politician, and writer on science and religion during the Victorian era.

Early life
Samuel Laing was born on 12 December 1812 in Edinburgh. His father, also called Samuel Laing (1780–1868), was a well-known author, whose books on Norway and Sweden attracted much attention. Laing the Younger's uncle was historian Malcolm Laing. Laing the Younger entered St John's College, Cambridge in 1827, and after graduating as Second Wrangler and Smith's Prizeman, was elected a fellow. He remained at Cambridge temporarily as a coach, before being called to the bar in 1837.

Career
He became private secretary to Henry Labouchere, later 1st Baron Taunton, who was then the President of the Board of Trade. In 1842, he was made secretary to the railway department, and retained this post until 1847. He had by then become an authority on railways, and had been a member of the Dalhousie Railway Commission; it was at his suggestion that the "parliamentary" rate of a penny a mile was instituted. In 1848, he was appointed chairman and managing director of the London, Brighton and South Coast Railway (LB&SCR), and his business acumen showed itself in the largely increased prosperity of the line. He also became chairman (1852) of  The Crystal Palace Company, but retired from both posts in 1855.

In 1852, he was elected to Parliament as a Liberal Party candidate in Wick Burghs. After losing his seat in 1857, he was re-elected in 1859, and appointed Financial Secretary to the Treasury; in 1860 he was made finance minister in India. On returning from India, he was re-elected to parliament for Wick in 1865. He was defeated in 1868, but in 1873 he was returned for Orkney and Shetland, and retained his seat until 1885. Early in 1867 he was elected to the board of the Great Eastern Railway who by that point were sliding towards receivership. On 1 July, the day before the GER went into receivership, he was reappointed chairman of the Brighton line, which was now on the point of bankruptcy following the over-ambitious expansion plans of the previous chairman. He continued in that post until 1896, and gradually restored the company to financial health. He was also chairman of the Railway Debenture Trust and the Railway Share Trust.

Science writer
In later life, he became well known as an author, his Modern Science and Modern Thought (1885), Problems of the Future (1889) and Human Origins (1892) being widely read, not only by reason of the writer's influential position, experience of affairs and clear style, but also through their popular and at the same time well-informed treatment of the scientific problems of the day. Laing's attitude was generally positive towards new developments in science, and he offered an optimistic vision of progressive modernity. He also wrote on religion. His book A Modern Zoroastrian argued that the ancient religion of Zoroastrianism was more consistent with modern scientific thought than was traditional Christianity. He argued that the "all pervading principle of polarity" that was central Zoroastrian thought has been confirmed by science, and that modern Christianity should abandon its traditional theology to centre on the figure of Jesus as an ideal of humanity.

Personal life 
Laing married Mary Dickson ( Cowan) (1819–1902). Together, they were the parents of eleven children:

 Samuel Laing (1843–1870), who died young.
 Malcolm Alfred Laing (1846–1917)
 Robert Laing (b. 1848)
 Cecilia Mary Bruce Laing (1848–1942)
 Mary Eliza Laing (1850–1936)
 Agnes Laing (1851–1933)
 Florence Elizabeth Laing (1853–1952), an artist who married Edward Sherard Kennedy, an illegitimate son of Robert Sherard, 6th Earl of Harborough. After his death in 1900, she married on 27 December 1902 Joannes Gennadius (1844–1932), later Greek Ambassador to England with whom she established the Gennadius Library at the American School of Classical Studies at Athens (ASCSA).
 Francis Kelly Lang (1854–1874)
 Theresa Uzielli Laing (1857–1943)
 Henry Rudolph Laing (1858–1941)
 Robert Laing (1859–1860), who died young.

Laing was often claimed to have been the father of the novelist Mary Eliza Kennard (1850–1936), this is in dispute. However birth entries at the General Register Office for her sons Lionel Edward Kennard and Malcolm Alfred Kennard both have Laing as the mother's maiden name. Furthermore the transcribed parish record entry for her marriage to Edward Kennard on 19 April 1870 at Saint Nicholas church, Brighton gives her name as Mary Eliza Laing, daughter of Samuel Laing.

Laing died on 6 August 1897 in Sydenham, England and was buried in the Brighton Extra Mural Cemetery.

References

External links 
 
 
 
 
 

1812 births
1897 deaths
19th-century Scottish writers
Alumni of St John's College, Cambridge
Scottish Liberal Party MPs
Members of the Parliament of the United Kingdom for Highland constituencies
UK MPs 1852–1857
UK MPs 1859–1865
UK MPs 1865–1868
Members of the Parliament of the United Kingdom for Orkney and Shetland
UK MPs 1868–1874
UK MPs 1874–1880
UK MPs 1880–1885
Second Wranglers
London, Brighton and South Coast Railway people
Directors of the Great Eastern Railway
Zoroastrian studies scholars
19th-century Scottish businesspeople